Navin Derrick Stewart (born June 13, 1983, in Roxborough, Tobago) is a Tobagonian first-class cricketer who plays for Trinidad and Tobago national cricket team. He also played for Guyana Amazon Warriors in 2014 and for Barbados Tridents in 2015 Caribbean Premier League. In June 2021, he was selected to take part in the Minor League Cricket tournament in the United States following the players' draft.

References

External links
 
 

1983 births
Living people
Trinidad and Tobago cricketers
Guyana Amazon Warriors cricketers
Barbados Royals cricketers